Donacia cinerea is a species of leaf beetles from a subfamily of Donaciella. It can be found in Czech Republic and Slovakia.

References

Donaciinae
Beetles of Europe
Beetles described in 1784
Taxa named by Johann Friedrich Wilhelm Herbst